Christine Clarke (born 11 August 1960) is a Canadian rower. She competed in the women's eight event at the 1984 Summer Olympics.

References

External links
 

1960 births
Living people
Canadian female rowers
Olympic rowers of Canada
Rowers at the 1984 Summer Olympics
Sportspeople from Scarborough, Toronto
Rowers from Toronto
Commonwealth Games medallists in rowing
Commonwealth Games gold medallists for Canada
Rowers at the 1986 Commonwealth Games
20th-century Canadian women
Medallists at the 1986 Commonwealth Games